Wietmarschen is a unitary municipality (Einheitsgemeinde) in the district of Grafschaft Bentheim in Lower Saxony, Germany. It is split into the villages of Wietmarschen, Füchtenfeld, Schwartenpohl, Lohnerbruch, Nordlohne and Lohne with Lohne being the biggest and having the town hall while Wietmarschen, which is the second biggest, having the name.

Geography
There are plans to construct a viewing tower on it.

Constituent communities
The municipality is divided into six Ortsteile named Wietmarschen, Füchtenfeld, Schwartenpohl, Lohnerbruch, Nordlohne and Lohne.

Religion
The community of Wietmarschen diverges sharply from the rest of the district with regard to religion in that it has a largely Catholic character. In February 2006, the community's religious affiliations broke down thus:
 74.3% Roman Catholic
 12.6% Evangelical Lutheran
 3.9% Evangelical Reformed
 9.2% other faiths, or no faith

Politics

Municipal council
Wietmarschen's council is made up of 28 councillors.
CDU 22 seats
SPD 5 seats
FDP 1 seat
(as of municipal election on 15 September 2016)

The town hall is in Lohne.

Mayor
The full-time mayor Manfred Wellen was elected on 25 May 2014 with 64.25% of the vote. He was re-elected in 2021.

Coat of arms
The community's arms show a red field with a stylized lily in the upper half of the middle flanked by a golden bulrush on each side sprouting up from the bottom and tilting away from the lily, and each with a golden leaf.

Partnership
Mortagne-au-Perche, France became a partner community of Wietmarschen on 2 July 1989.

Culture and sightseeing

Museums
Heimathaus Lohne (local museum)
Heimathaus Wietmarschen, the so-called Packhaus (local museum)
Treckermuseum Wietmarschen (tractor museum)

Buildings
Stiftskirche Wietmarschen (nunnery church), restored historic nunnery area behind the church
Stiftsbusch (nunnery copse) with chapels
Sankt-Antonius-Kirche Lohne (church)
Mühlenturm Wietmarschen (mill tower)
Urbrecker (statue of a bog iron miner)
Glockenturm Südlohne (belltower)
Schafstall Moormann (sheep pen)

Sport venues
5 gymnasia
10 sport fields
4 beach volleyball fields
2 tennis courts
1 big riding centre
2 model aircraft fields
1 miniature car track
1 gliderport

Regular events
Yearly
marksmen's festival
Urbreckerfest
kermis
pilgrimage

Economy and infrastructure

Public transport
 Bus line 161: Lingen — Nordlohne — Lohne — Lohnerbruch — Wietmarschen — Füchtenfeld
 Bus line 165: Lingen — Nordlohne — Lohne — Rükel — Südlohne — Klausheide — Nordhorn
 Nearest railway stations:
 Lingen (Ems) for Meppen, Leer, Emden, Rheine, Münster
 Intercity: Düsseldorf, Karlsruhe
 Bad Bentheim for Rheine, Osnabrück, Bielefeld, Hengelo (Netherlands),
 Intercity: Hanover, Berlin, Amsterdam (Schiphol)

Established businesses
 W.A.S, Ambulances and Security Vehicles
 Ewabo, cleaning agent and disinfectant manufacturer
 Wirtschaft Innovation Nordwest, business advisers and advertising agents
 Bauunternehmen Overberg, construction

Education
Marien-Schule Wietmarschen (elementary school and Hauptschule)

Grundschule Lohne (elementary school)

Schulzentrum Lohne (Hauptschule and Realschule)

Famous persons
 August Perk, German Resistance Fighter against the National Socialism, briefly Friendship with Erich Maria Remarque and had Influence on Remarques world-famous Novel "All Quiet on the Western Front", Grandfather of Johnny de Brest.
 Erich Maria Remarque, writer, worked as a teacher in Lohne in 1919
 Mattias Rosemann, deacon

References

External links
  

County of Bentheim (district)